Kumbia may refer to:

Kumbia, Queensland, a town in Australia
a common alternative spelling of Koumbia, Guinea, a sub-prefecture

See also 
 
 Koumbia (disambiguation)
 Cumbia, a style of music and dance
 Cumbria, a county in England